Kaghan is a small town and union council of the Balakot Tehsil, in Mansehra District of Khyber Pakhtunkhwa province of Pakistan. 

Kaghan Valley is named after the town.

References

Union councils of Mansehra District